is a train station in Kōnan-ku, Niigata, Niigata Prefecture, Japan, operated by East Japan Railway Company (JR East).

Lines

Layout
The station consists of a ground-level island platform, serving two tracks, with the station situated above the tracks. The station has a "Midori no Madoguchi" staffed ticket office.

Platforms

History
The station opened on 20 November 1897. With the privatization of Japanese National Railways (JNR) on 1 April 1987, the station came under the control of JR East.

Passenger statistics
In fiscal 2017, the station was used by an average of 5,378 passengers daily (boarding passengers only).

Surrounding area
 Niigata Kōyō High School
 Niigata Meikun Junior and Senior High School

See also
 List of railway stations in Japan

References

External links

 JR East station information 

Railway stations in Niigata Prefecture
Shin'etsu Main Line
Railway stations in Japan opened in 1897
Railway stations in Niigata (city)